Ässät or Ässä may refer to: 

HC Ässät Pori Oy, Finnish sports club
Porin Ässät (men's ice hockey)
Porin Ässät (women's ice hockey)
Porin Ässät (men's football)
PATA (esports)
, Finnish band from Oulu
S Group, Finnish Consumers' co-operative. Also known as Ässä or Ässät
, Finnish military regiment. Better known as Ässärykmentti or Ässät
, Finnish military regiment. Better known as Ässärykmentti or Ässät
List of World War II aces from Finland, Finnish aces of World War II, Hävittäjä-Ässä, Ässä or Ässät in Finnish